Llanrwst United  is a Welsh football club based in Llanrwst in the Conwy Valley. They play in the Ardal Leagues North West, which is in the third tier of the Welsh football league system. The club colours are red and white.

History
Llanrwst United were founded in 1983 after Llanrwst Town and Llanrwst Athletic merged.

In the 2012–13 season the club won the Barritt Cup.

Ground
Llanrwst play at the Gwydir Park ground, close to the bridge in the centre of the town.

References

External links
Llanrwst Utd Football Club

Llanrwst
Football clubs in Wales
Welsh Alliance League clubs
Association football clubs established in 1983
Gwynedd League clubs
1983 establishments in Wales
Ardal Leagues clubs
Vale of Conwy Football League clubs